Lentinus levis is a species of edible fungus in the family Polyporaceae. It was described by Miles Joseph Berkeley and Moses Ashley Curtis in 1853 and given its current name in 1915 by William Murrill. As a saprotroph, it can be cultivated. In nature it grows in subtropical to tropical climate. It is recognized and sometimes collected as a food by Huichol people of Mexico, although they prefer eating other, less chewy mushrooms. For a long time thought to be a member of Pleurotus genus, it has been moved to genus Lentinus.

Description
Fruiting bodies of Lentinus levis resemble those of Pleurotus dryinus and can be confused with them. Both are centrally stipitate, have decurrent lamellae and exhibit a partial veil (which is more persistent in P. dryinus and can be lacking in young L. levis). The pileus surface in L. levis is usually velutinous, while in P. dryinus it is radially fibrillose. L. levis produces a floral odor resembling that of Pleurotus pulmonarius).

References

External links 
 

Fungi described in 1853
Polyporaceae